Tournaments include international (FIBA), professional (club) and amateur and collegiate levels.

Tournaments

Men's tournaments

Olympics
FIBA World Olympic Qualifying Tournament 2008 at Athens

2008 Olympics at Beijing

Other tournaments
EuroBasket 2009 qualification

Women's tournaments

Olympics
FIBA World Olympic Qualifying Tournament for Women 2008 at Madrid

2008 Olympics at Beijing

Other tournaments
EuroBasket Women 2009 qualification

Youth tournaments

Club championships

Continental seasons

Men

National championships
Men:
 NBA
Season:
Western Conference: Los Angeles Lakers (57-25)
Eastern Conference and League: Boston Celtics (66-16)
Other Division champions: Detroit Pistons, New Orleans Hornets, Utah Jazz, Orlando Magic
Finals: The Boston Celtics defeat the Los Angeles Lakers 4-2 in the best-of-seven NBA Finals. Finals MVP: Paul Pierce
 Liga Nacional de Básquet, 2007–08 season:
 Regular season: Libertad
 Playoffs: Libertad defeat Quimsa 4–0 in the best-of-seven final.
 National Basketball League, 2007–08 season: The Melbourne Tigers defeat the Sydney Kings 3-2 in the best-of-five grand finals.
 Chinese Basketball Association, 2007–08 season: The Guangdong Southern Tigers defeat the Liaoning Hunters 4-1 in the best-of-seven finals.
 Croatian League:
 Estonian League, 2007–08: TÜ/Rock defeat Kalev/Cramo 4–0 in the best-of-7 final.
 French League: Nancy crush defending champions Chorale Roanne 84–53 in the one-off final.
 German Bundesliga:
 Greek League: Panathinaikos defeat Olympiacos 3–2 in the best-of-five final.
 Iranian Super League, 2007–08 season: Mahram defeat Saba Battery 2–0 in the best-of-three final.
 Israel Super League: Hapoel Holon defeat Maccabi Tel Aviv, the 14-time defending champions, 73–72 in the one-off final.
 Italian Serie A: Montepaschi Siena defeat Lottomatica Roma 4-1 in the best-of-seven final.
 Lithuanian LKL: Žalgiris defeat Lietuvos Rytas 4-1 in the best-of-seven final.
 Montenegro League:
 Philippine Basketball Association, 2007–08 season:
Philippine Cup: The Sta. Lucia Realtors defeat the Purefoods Tender Juicy Giants 4-3 in the best-of-seven finals. Finals MVP: Dennis Espino
Fiesta Conference: The Barangay Ginebra Kings defeat the Air21 Express 4-3 in the best-of-seven Finals. Finals MVPs: Ronald Tubid and Eric Menk
 Polish League:
 Russian Super League, 2007–08 season: CSKA Moscow sweep Dynamo Moscow 3–0 in the best-of-five final.
 Serbia Super League:
 Slovenian League: Union Olimpija defeat Helios Domžale 3-1 in the best-of-five finals.
 Spanish ACB:
Season: Real Madrid
Playoffs: TAU Cerámica sweep AXA FC Barcelona 3–0 in the best-of-five final.
 Turkish Basketball League:
 British Basketball League, 2007–08:
Season:
Playoffs:
  Adriatic League:

Women:
 2008 WNBA Finals: Detroit Shock
EuroLeague Women 2007–08:  Spartak Moscow Region

College

Men 

 NCAA
Division I: Kansas 75, Memphis 68 OT
Most Outstanding Player: Mario Chalmers, Kansas
National Invitation Tournament:
Division II: Winona State (MN) 87, Augusta State (GA) 76
Division III: Washington University in St. Louis (MO) 90, Amherst 68
 NAIA
NAIA Division I: Oklahoma City 75, Mountain State (WV) 72
NAIA Division II: Oregon Tech 63, Bellevue (NE) 56
 NJCAA
Division I: South Plains College 67, Salt Lake CC 56
Division II: Mott Community College 83, Columb State Community College 73
Division III: North Lake College TX 73, Joliet Junior College IL 70

Philippine Collegiate Championship 2008: De La Salle University 71, Ateneo de Manila University 62
UAAP Men's: Ateneo de Manila University def. De La Salle University, 2-0 in the finals series
NCAA (Philippines) Seniors':  San Beda College def. José Rizal University, 2-1 in the finals series

Women
 NCAA
Division I: Tennessee 64, Stanford 48
Most Outstanding Player: Candace Parker, Tennessee
WNIT: Marquette 81, Michigan State 66
Division II: Northern Kentucky 63, South Dakota 58
Division III:  Howard Payne (TX) 68, Messiah (PA) 54
 NAIA
NAIA Division I: Vanguard (CA) 72, Trevecca Nazarene (TN) 59
NAIA Division II: Northwestern College 82, College of the Ozarks MO 75
 NJCAA
Division I: Gulf Coast 62, Central Arizona 61
Division II: Kirkwood 78 vs Kankakee 53 (Final)
Division III: Monroe CC NY 79, Mohawk Valley CC 48
 UAAP Women's: Far Eastern University def. University of the Philippines, 2-0 in the finals series

Prep
 USA Today Boys Basketball Ranking #1: St. Anthony High School (New Jersey), Jersey City, New Jersey
 USA Today Girls Basketball Ranking #1: Sacred Heart Cathedral Preparatory, San Francisco, California
 NCAA (Philippines) Juniors: San Sebastian College-Recoletos def. Colegio de San Juan de Letran, 2-0 in the finals series
 UAAP Juniors: Ateneo High School def. De La Salle Zobel, 2-0 in the finals series

Awards and honors

Basketball Hall of Fame
Class of 2008:
 Players: Adrian Dantley, Patrick Ewing, Hakeem Olajuwon
 Coaches: Pat Riley, Cathy Rush
 Contributors: William Davidson, Dick Vitale

Women's Basketball Hall of Fame
Class of 2008
 Debbie Ryan
 Patty Broderick
 Lin L. Laursen
 Jill Rankin Schneider
 Suzie McConnell-Serio
 Michelle Timms

Professional
Men
NBA Most Valuable Player Award: Kobe Bryant, Los Angeles Lakers
NBA Rookie of the Year Award: Kevin Durant, Seattle SuperSonics
NBA Defensive Player of the Year Award: Kevin Garnett, Boston Celtics
NBA Sixth Man of the Year Award: Manu Ginóbili, San Antonio Spurs
NBA Most Improved Player Award: Hedo Türkoğlu, Orlando Magic
NBA Coach of the Year Award: Byron Scott, New Orleans Hornets
Euroscar Award: Pau Gasol, Los Angeles Lakers and Spain (also Memphis Grizzlies)
Mr. Europa: Ricky Rubio, Joventut Badalona and 
Women
WNBA Most Valuable Player Award: Candace Parker, Los Angeles Sparks
WNBA Defensive Player of the Year Award: Lisa Leslie, Los Angeles Sparks
WNBA Rookie of the Year Award: Candace Parker, Los Angeles Sparks
WNBA Sixth Woman of the Year Award: Candice Wiggins, Minnesota Lynx
WNBA Most Improved Player Award: Ebony Hoffman, Indiana Fever
Kim Perrot Sportsmanship Award: Vickie Johnson, San Antonio Silver Stars
WNBA Coach of the Year Award: Mike Thibault, Connecticut Sun
WNBA Finals Most Valuable Player Award: Katie Smith, Detroit Shock
FIBA Europe Player of the Year Award: Maria Stepanova,  CSKA Samara and

Collegiate 
 Combined
Legends of Coaching Award: Pat Summitt, Tennessee
 Men
John R. Wooden Award: Tyler Hansbrough, North Carolina
Naismith College Coach of the Year: John Calipari, Memphis
Frances Pomeroy Naismith Award: Mike Green, Butler
Associated Press College Basketball Player of the Year: Tyler Hansbrough, North Carolina
NCAA basketball tournament Most Outstanding Player: Wayne Ellington, North Carolina
USBWA National Freshman of the Year: Michael Beasley, Kansas State
Associated Press College Basketball Coach of the Year: Keno Davis, Drake
Naismith Outstanding Contribution to Basketball: Dick Vitale
 Women
John R. Wooden Award: Candace Parker, Tennessee
Naismith College Player of the Year: Candace Parker, Tennessee
Naismith College Coach of the Year: Geno Auriemma, Connecticut
Wade Trophy: Candice Wiggins, Stanford
Frances Pomeroy Naismith Award: Jolene Anderson, Wisconsin
Associated Press Women's College Basketball Player of the Year: Candace Parker, Tennessee
NCAA basketball tournament Most Outstanding Player: Candace Parker, Tennessee
Basketball Academic All-America Team: Candace Parker, Tennessee
Carol Eckman Award: Doug Bruno, DePaul University
Maggie Dixon Award: Jeff Walz, Louisville
USBWA National Freshman of the Year: Maya Moore, Connecticut
Associated Press College Basketball Coach of the Year: Geno Auriemma, Connecticut
List of Senior CLASS Award women's basketball winners: Candice Wiggins, Stanford
Nancy Lieberman Award: Kristi Toliver, Maryland
Naismith Outstanding Contribution to Basketball: Jody Conradt

Events
 The Seattle SuperSonics relocated to Oklahoma City, Oklahoma.

Movies
More than a Game
Semi-Pro – a screwball comedy film starring Will Ferrell, loosely based on the American Basketball Association in the 1970s.

Deaths
 March 22 — Red Stroud, American ABA player (New Orleans Buccaneers) (born 1941)
 March 25 — Ben Carnevale, American Hall of Fame coach of the Navy Midshipmen and North Carolina Tar Heels (born 1915)
 April 1 — Marvin Stone, former Kentucky Wildcats and Louisville Cardinals player (born 1981)
 April 4 — Julius McCoy, 76, All-American college player at Michigan State (1956).
 April 9 — Art Spoelstra, American NBA player (Rochester Royals, Minneapolis Lakers, New York Knicks) (born 1932)
 May 5 — Sam Aubrey, American college player and coach (Oklahoma State) (born 1922)
 May 23 — Bob Knight, American professional basketball player (New York Knicks) (born 1929)
 June 25 — A. L. Bennett, American college player (Oklahoma State) (born 1924)
 July 15 — Gennadi Volnov, Russian (Soviet) Olympic gold medalist (1972) (born 1939)
 August 20 — Larry Hennessy, American Villanova All-American (born 1929)
 August 20 — Kevin Duckworth,  American NBA All-Star with the Portland Trail Blazers (born 1964)
 September 5 —Bob Cluggish, American BAA player (New York Knicks) (born 1917)
 September 5 — Doyle Parrack, American college coach (Oklahoma City, Oklahoma) (born 1921)
 September 6 — LeRoy Gardner Jr., University of Minnesota guard from 1966 to 1969. (born 1947)
 September 8 — Don Haskins, American Hall of Fame coach of the UTEP Miners, 1966 National Champions (born 1930)
 September 19 — Ernie Andres, All-American college player (Indiana), NBL player (Indianapolis Kautskys) (born 1918)
 November 17 — Pete Newell, American Hall of Fame coach of the California Golden Bears, 1959 National Champions (born 1915)

References

External links